Edward Browne may refer to:

Politicians
Edward E. Browne (1868–1945), U.S. Representative from Wisconsin
Edward Browne (MP) ( 1584–1586) for Gatton
Edward Browne (Irish politician), Irish senator
Edward L. Browne (1830–1925), member of the Wisconsin State Senate

Others
Edward Browne (physician) (1644–1708), English physician, President of the Royal College of Physicians 1704–1707
Edward Harold Browne (1811–1891), Bishop of the Church of England
Edward Stevenson Browne (1852–1907), English recipient of the Victoria Cross
Edward Granville Browne (1862–1926), British orientalist

See also 
Edward Brown (disambiguation)